The Regional Council of Guadeloupe consists of 41 members.

President 
Presidents of the Regional Council of Guadeloupe:

Sources
 worldstatesmen.org

Politics of Guadeloupe
Guadeloupe-related lists
Government of Guadeloupe